Helena Vidal (born ) is an Argentine female volleyball player. She is part of the Argentina women's national volleyball team.

She participated in the 2017 FIVB Volleyball World Grand Prix, and 2018 FIVB Volleyball Women's Nations League
 
At club level she played for Villa Dora in 2018.

References

External links 

 FIVB profile
  

1989 births
Living people
Argentine women's volleyball players
Place of birth missing (living people)